Timelines of Iraq history include:

 Timeline of Baghdad
 Timeline of Basra
 Timeline of Mosul